James Hamilton Traill,  (2 November 1896 – 14 August 1967) was an Australian flying ace of the First World War credited with six aerial victories.

References

1896 births
1967 deaths
Australian Army soldiers
Australian Flying Corps officers
Australian recipients of the Distinguished Flying Cross (United Kingdom)
Australian World War I flying aces
People from Upper Hunter Shire Council